Impôts FC is a Cameroonian football club based in Yaoundé. They are a member of the Cameroonian Football Federation. The won the 2005 Coupe de Cameroun, winning unexpectedly from the second division, with a 1-0 win over Unisport Bafang.  

The club was relegated from Cameroon Premiere Division in 2006.

Honours
 Cameroon Première Division: 0
 Cameroon Cup: 1
 2005.

Super Coupe Roger Milla: 0

Performance in CAF competitions
CAF Confederation Cup: 1 appearance
2006 – Preliminary Round

References

Association football clubs established in 2000
Football clubs in Yaoundé
2000 establishments in Cameroon